Probable ATP-dependent RNA helicase DHX58 also known as RIG-I-like receptor 3 (RLR-3) or RIG-I-like receptor LGP2 (RLR) is a RIG-I-like receptor dsRNA helicase enzyme that in humans is encoded by the DHX58 gene.  The protein encoded by the gene DHX58 is known as LGP2 (Laboratory of Genetics and Physiology 2).

Structure and function 

LGP2 was first identified and characterized in the context of mammary tissue in 2001, but its function has been found to be more relevant to the field of innate antiviral immunity. LGP2 has been found to be essential for producing effective antiviral responses against many viruses that are recognized by RIG-I and MDA5.

Since LGP2 lacks CARD domains, its effect on downstream antiviral signaling is likely due to interaction with dsRNA viral ligand or the other RLRs (RIG-I and MDA5).

LGP2 has been shown to directly interact with RIG-I through its C-terminal repressor domain (RD).  The primary contact sites in this interaction is likely between the RD of LGP2 and the CARD or helicase domain of RIG-I as it is seen with RIG-I self-association, but this has not been confirmed.  The helicase activity of LGP2 has been found to be essential for its positive regulation of RIG-I signaling.  Overexpression of LGP2 is able to inhibit RIG-I-mediated antiviral signaling both in the presence and absence of viral ligands. This inhibition of RIG-I signaling is not dependent upon the ability of LGP2 to bind viral ligands and is therefore not due to ligand competition. Although LGP2 binds to dsRNA with higher affinity, it is dispensable for RIG-I-mediated recognition of synthetic dsRNA ligands.  RIG-I, when overexpressed and in LGP2 knock-down studies, has been shown to induce antiviral response in the absence of viral ligand.

References

Further reading

RIG-I-like receptors
Intracellular receptors